Petrochromis polyodon is a species of cichlid endemic to Lake Tanganyika found in areas with rocky substrates where it can graze on algae. This species coexists with other herbivorous cichlids such as Tropheus moorii and Telmatochromis temporalis. Individuals can reach lengths of 40cm or 16 inches and 1kg in weight. They can be found in the aquarium trade.

References

polyodon
Taxa named by George Albert Boulenger
Fish described in 1898
Taxonomy articles created by Polbot